Aleksei Alekseyevich Panin (born 23 February 1979) is a former Russian football player.

References

1979 births
Living people
Russian footballers
FC Lokomotiv Nizhny Novgorod players
Russian Premier League players
Association football midfielders
FC Khimik Dzerzhinsk players